Bruce Dickey is an American cornett player. He is regarded as the doyen of the modern generation of cornett players, many of whom were his students at the Schola Cantorum Basiliensis and Early Music Institute at Indiana University, or students of his students. In 1987 he founded the ensemble Concerto Palatino with the Dutch baroque trombonist Charles Toet, following the name of the original eight-man Concerto Palatino della Signoria di Bologna of San Petronio which was famed from 1530 to 1800. He is married to the American singer and conductor Candace Smith, with whom he founded Artemisia Editions, which specializes in publishing editions of 17th-century Italian sacred music.

He attended Indiana University School of Music.

References

Bruce Dickey website at Concerto Palatino.com
Bruce Dickey biography at Bach Cantatas.com

Year of birth missing (living people)
Living people
Cornett players
Indiana University faculty
Jacobs School of Music alumni
Academic staff of Schola Cantorum Basiliensis
Schola Cantorum Basiliensis alumni
American expatriates in Switzerland